Arganzuela is one of the 21 districts of the city of Madrid, Spain.

Geography

Position
Arganzuela is located in central-southern Madrid, separated from Latina, Carabanchel and Usera by the river Manzanares. The other bordering districts are Centro, Retiro and Puente de Vallecas.

Subdivision
The district is administratively divided into 7 wards (Barrios):
Atocha
Imperial
La Chopera
Las Acacias
Las Delicias
Legazpi
Palos de Moguer

Sightseeing
Matadero Madrid, in Arganzuela, is a former slaughterhouse that is currently a free entrance area and cultural centre where many activities take place in daytime.

See also
Gate of Toledo
Madrid Atocha railway station

References

External links 

 
Districts of Madrid